Events in the year 1919 in Mexico.

Incumbents

Federal government 
 President: Venustiano Carranza

Governors 
 Aguascalientes: Aurelio L. González
 Campeche: Joaquín Mucel Acereto/Enrique Arias Solís
 Chiapas: Pablo Villanueva/Manuel Fuentes A./Pascual Morales Molina
 Chihuahua: Melquiades Angulo/Andrés Ortiz
 Coahuila: Gustavo Espinoza Mireles
 Colima: Interim Governors
 Durango:  
 Guanajuato: Agustín Alcocer/Federico Montes
 Guerrero: Francisco Figueroa Mata
 Hidalgo: 
 Jalisco: Luis Castellanos y Tapia
 State of Mexico: Joaquín García Luna/Agustín Millán Vivero/Francisco Javier Gaxiola
 Michoacán: 
 Morelos: José G. Aguilar/Benito Tajonar
 Nayarit: Francisco D. Santiago
 Nuevo León: Nicéforo Zambrano/José E. Santos
 Oaxaca: Juan Jiménez Méndez
 Puebla: Alfonso Cabrera Lobato
 Querétaro: Salvador Argain Domínguez
 San Luis Potosí: Juan G. Barragán Rodríguez/Severino Martínez Gómez
 Sinaloa: Ramón F. Iturbe
 Sonora: Plutarco Elías Calles/Adolfo de la Huerta
 Tabasco: Heriberto Jara Corona/Carlos A. Vidal/Carlos Greene Ramírez
 Tamaulipas: Francisco González Villarreal
 Tlaxcala: 	 
 Veracruz: Cándido Aguilar Vargas
 Yucatán: 
 Zacatecas:

Events 
10 April: Emiliano Zapata is ambushed and assassinated in Chinameca, Morelos.
25 May: Francisco "Pancho" Villa takes the town of Parral, Chihuahua, and hangs the mayor.
June: Ciudad Juárez, Chihuahua, attacked in Pancho Villa's final raid

Popular culture

Sports

Music

Film

Literature

Notable births
15 March — Piratita Morgan (Raymundo Rodríguez), wrestler (d. 2018)
1 April — Antonio Toledo Corro, Governor of Sinaloa 1981–1986 (d. 2018)
16 April — Pedro Ramírez Vázquez, architect (Museo Nacional de Antropología).
17 May — Antonio Aguilar, singer/actor.
29 June — Ernesto Corripio y Ahumada, cardinal (d. 2008)
2 October — José Ángel Espinoza, singer-songwriter and actor (d. 2015)
Date unknown
Romeo Gómez Aguilar (97), músician and academic (d. 2019).

Notable deaths
10 April - Emiliano Zapata, (39), southern leader of the Mexican Revolution, assassinated (b. 1879)
9 November - Virginia Salinas de Carranza, wife of President Venustiano Carranza
26 November – Felipe Ángeles, executed after a court-martial.

 
Years of the 20th century in Mexico
Mexico